The University of Provence Aix-Marseille I was a public research university mostly located in Aix-en-Provence and Marseille. It was one of the three Universities of Aix-Marseille and was part of the Academy of Aix and Marseille. On 1 January 2012 it merged with the University of the Mediterranean and Paul Cézanne University to become Aix-Marseille University, the youngest, but also the largest in terms of students, budgets and staff in the French-speaking world.

Overview
The University of Provence was founded on 9 December 1409 as a studium generale by Louis II of Anjou, Count of Provence, and subsequently recognized by papal bull issued by Antipope Alexander V. In 1792, the University of Provence, along with twenty-one other universities, was dissolved. The university was recreated in 1896. Following riots among university students in May 1968, it was re-established in 1970 through a merger of the school of humanities in Aix-en-Provence and the science one in Marseille. "The University of Provence [was] one of the most distinguished in France, second only to the University of Paris in the areas of French literature, history, and linguistics", according to Harvard University's website.

In the academic year of 2007–2008, 23,056 students were enrolled. Among them, 15,158 were female, while only 7,898 were male. 3,255 students came from countries outside France, 44 per cent of these came from Africa. 15,109 students studied in Aix-en-Provence, while others went to Marseille, Avignon, Digne, Lambesc, Arles and Aubagne. Overall, its facilities spanned 258 143 m2.

In 2007, the budget was 120,7 million euros, with 39,2 million euros available after wages.

It had its own university press, Publications de l'Université de Provence. It also had its own theater, the Théâtre Antoine Vitez, named for Antoine Vitez.

Departments
 Ancient Civilisations
 Anthropology
 Applied Linguistics
 Arabic, Berber languages, Persian, Turkish, Yiddish, Hebrew
 Art History and Archeology
 Biology
 Chemistry and Physics
 Cognitive Psychology
 Developing and Differential Psychology
 Drama
 English
 Environmental Studies
 Ergology
 French
 Film Studies
 Geography and Urban Planning
 German
 Hellenism
 Hispanic and Latin American Studies
 History
 Information Technology
 Italian
 Korean
 Linguistics
 Mathematics, Computer Science and Mechanics
 Media Studies
 Miscellaneous Languages (Armenian, Hindi and Japanese)
 Music
 Philosophy
 Phonetics and French as a Foreign Language
 Portuguese
 Psychology and Psychopathology
 Romanian
 Slavic Languages (Russian, Bulgarian, Polish, Serbian, Croatian, Bosnian, Czech)
 Sociology
 Teaching Studies
 Visual Arts

Notable faculty and alumni
Christian Bromberger, professor of anthropology and an expert of Iranian studies
Georges Duby taught at the University of Provence.
 Mansour Mohamed El-Kikhia: Libyan politician and member of the interim National Transitional Council (NTC).
 Sadaf Foroughi and Kiarash Anvari are graduates of the film studies department.
Gilles-Gaston Granger taught there from 1964 to 1986.
Martine L. Jacquot, writer, journalist
Pablo Daniel Magee, writer and investigative journalist, followed Hispanic and Latin American Studies at the University of Provence.
Prof. Dr. John H. Hubbard taught at the University of Provence.
2008 Nobel Prize laureate in literature J.M.G. Le Clézio earned a master's degree with a thesis on Henri Michaux from the University of Provence in 1964.
Annie Ousset-Krief, published historian and  American Civilization specialist, taught at the University of Provence.
Paul Veyne taught at the University of Provence in the 1960s.
Norodom Ranariddh, a Cambodian politician and prince. He is a close relative to the current king of Cambodia, Norodom Sihamoni.

References

External links
  
  
Télé Campus Provence

 
Aix-Marseille University
Defunct universities and colleges in France
Educational institutions established in 1969
Educational institutions disestablished in 2012
University of Provence
University of Provence
Buildings and structures in Marseille
1400s establishments in France
1409 establishments in Europe
1969 establishments in France
2012 disestablishments in France